Entomoculiini is a tribe of rove beetles in the subfamily Leptotyphlinae.

References

External links 
 

 Entomoculiini at insectoid.info

Leptotyphlinae
Polyphaga tribes